Konstantinos Lambrinopoulos or Lamprinopoulos (1893-1965) was a Greek judge, politician and Mayor of Patras from 18 August 1950 until 12 February 1951.

He was born in 1893 in Kyparissia in the northwestern Messenia Prefecture. He studied law in the University of Athens and lived originally in Patras, before returning to work as a judge in Kyparissia. He later continued as chairman of the court of first instance in Sparti until he was transferred to Patras to fill the vacant post of Mayor of Patras, according to the then-current law. He was forced to resign soon after, however, in order to be appointed councillor for life of the Court of Audit in Athens. He later assumed a seat in the Areopagus, until his retirement in 1963.

He was married and had four children. He died in Athens in 1965.

References
The first version of the article is translated and is based from the article at the Greek Wikipedia (el:Main Page)

1893 births
1965 deaths
20th-century Greek judges
People from Kyparissia
Mayors of Patras
National and Kapodistrian University of Athens alumni